The Goderdzi Petrified Forest Natural Monument is a natural monument in Georgia.

Status
This area is listed as a Natural Monument in the List of Protected Areas of Georgia. Together with the Borjomi Strict Nature Reserve, Borjomi-Kharagauli National Park and Nedzvi Managed Reserve it is one of four protected areas under same management authority.

Geology and palaeontology
In the Tertiary period, volcanic eruptions and strong winds caused tropical forest to petrify. Plant fossils from the Late Pliocene forest — palm trees, magnolia, laurel, birch, hornbeam, beech - are preserved as prints of semi-fossilized leaves and stems in volcanic tufa. Examples of the "Goderdzi Flora" are known from two localities, in the Adigeni and in the Khulo municipalities in the historical region of Meskheti. Petrified fossils are found in the valley of Dzindzistskali river, the right tributary of Kvabliani, on the eastern slope of Goderdzi Pass at an altitude of 1,600-2,100 m above sea level. This is one of the richest and well studied fossil floras.

References

Natural monuments of Georgia (country)
Petrified forests
Pliocene